The Sarasaviya Best Male Playback Singer Award is presented annually by the weekly Sarasaviya newspaper in collaboration with the Associated Newspapers of Ceylon Limited at the Sarasaviya Awards Festival.
Although the Sarasaviya Awards Ceremony began in 1964, this award was introduced much later. 

Following is a list of the award winners since its introduction:

Male Playback